Bezalel ben Joel Ronsburg (1760 – 25 September 1820) was a Bohemian Talmudist and rabbi, dayan and head of the yeshiva in Prague. Zecharias Frankel was one of his pupils.

Biography
Ronsburg was the author of Horah Gaver (Prague, 1802), commentary on the tractate Horayot, and Ma'aseh Rav (ib. 1823), marginal notes on the Talmud, reprinted in the Prague (1830–32) edition of the Talmud and in several later ones. Under the title Sedeh Tzofim, in the Prague (1839–46) edition of the Talmud, are printed Ronsburg's notes to the Halakot of Asher ben Jehiel; the same are reprinted in Romm's Wilna edition. The following works by Ronsburg remain in manuscript (as of 1906): Pitche Niddah, (later printed by Mossad HaRav Kook) novellæ, and Sichat Chullin.

At the official naming of the Jews, Ronsburg (the name is derived from Ronsperg, a city in Bohemia, and is pronounced "ronsh-berg") took the name Daniel Bezaleel Rosenbaum, the initials standing for both surnames; he continued to be known, however, as Ronsburg.

References

 Its bibliography:
Kisch, in Monatsschrift, xlv.220;
Zedner, Cat. Hebr. Books Brit. Mus. under the erroneous spelling Rendsburg;
Fürst, Bibl. Jud. iii.129, s.v. Ranschburg.

1760 births
1820 deaths
19th-century Czech rabbis
German Orthodox rabbis
People from Poběžovice
18th-century Bohemian rabbis
Rabbis from Prague